The Congress of the Communist Party of Cuba (Congreso del Partido Comunista de Cuba) is the highest decision-making body of the Cuban party-state.

Convocations

References

General
Information on congresses, number of delegates, number of people elected to CCs, party membership, the individual who presented the Political Report and information on when the congress was convened can be found in these sources:

Bibliography
Articles and journals:

Specific

Politics of Cuba
Communist Party of Cuba
Congresses of communist parties